Musa Barrow (born 14 November 1998) is a Gambian professional footballer who plays as a forward for  club Bologna and the Gambia national team.

Club career

Early career
Barrow joined Atalanta in 2016 from The Gambia where he played football locally and in the street, and in his first appearance with the youth squad scored two goals from midfield. He joined the first team squad in 2018 after scoring 19 goals in 15 games for the youth side.

Atalanta
Barrow made his professional debut with Atalanta in a 1–0 Coppa Italia loss to Juventus on 30 January 2018. He made his Serie A debut for Atalanta in a 1–1 tie with Crotone on 10 February 2018.

He had his first start on 13 April 2018 in an 0–0 home draw against Inter Milan.

On 18 September 2019, Barrow made his Champions League debut against Dinamo Zagreb.

Bologna
On 17 January 2020, Barrow moved from Atalanta to Bologna on loan with an obligation to buy for a fee reported to be around €13 million. Soon after his transfer, Barrow became the starting striker under Siniša Mihajlović and became one of their top scorers of the season despite only arriving in January. On 2 July 2021, Bologna purchased his rights.

International career
On 1 June 2018, Barrow scored the only goal for the Gambia U23s in a 1–0 friendly win over the Morocco U23s.

Barrow made his debut for the senior Gambia national football team in a 1–1 2019 Africa Cup of Nations qualification draw with Algeria on 8 September 2018.

He played and scored 2 goals in the tournament in the 2021 Africa cup of Nations, his national team's first continental tournament, where they made a sensational quarter-final.

Career statistics

Club

International

Scores and results list Gambia's goal tally first, score column indicates score after each Barrow goal.

References

External links

 
 
 Atalanta Profile
 
 Serie A Profile

1998 births
Living people
Sportspeople from Banjul
Gambian footballers
Association football forwards
Atalanta B.C. players
Bologna F.C. 1909 players
Serie A players
The Gambia youth international footballers
The Gambia international footballers
2021 Africa Cup of Nations players
Gambian expatriate footballers
Gambian expatriate sportspeople in Italy
Expatriate footballers in Italy